Ottilie Klein (born 14 February 1984) is a German politician of the Christian Democratic Union (CDU) who has been serving as a member of the Bundestag since 2021.

Early life and education
Klein was born to Russia Germans in the West German town of Villingen-Schwenningen. During her studies, she worked at the Alexander von Humboldt Foundation in 2007.

Early career
In 2017, Klein briefly worked as a parliamentary advisor to Sybille Benning. She worked for the CDU’s group in the State Parliament of Berlin, first as chief of staff to its successive chairs Florian Graf and Burkhard Dregger (2017–2020) and as the group’s head of strategy and policy planning (2018–2020). From 2020 to 2021, Klein worked at the Association of Public Banks (VÖB).

Political career
Ahead of the 2021 elections, the CDU in Berlin voted Klein to the third place on its list, after Monika Grütters and Jan-Marco Luczak.

Klein was subsequently elected to the Bundestag in 2021, representing the Berlin-Mitte district. In parliament, she has since been serving on the Committee on Labour and Social Affairs and the Committee on European Affairs. 

In the negotiations to form a coalition government between the CDU and the Social Democratic Party (SPD) under the leadership of Kai Wegner following Berlin’s 2023 state elections, Klein co-chaired the working group on labour social affairs; her counterpart of the Social Democrats was Lars Düsterhöft.

Other activities
 Otto Benecke Foundation, Member of the Board of Trustees
 Terre des Femmes, Member
 German Academic Scholarship Foundation, Member of the Selection Committee (–2022)

Personal life
Klein practices kickboxing.

References 

Living people
1984 births
Christian Democratic Union of Germany politicians
Members of the Bundestag 2021–2025
21st-century German politicians
21st-century German women politicians
Female members of the Bundestag